This page details the all-time statistics, records, and other achievements pertaining to the Minnesota Lynx.

Franchise Leaders 

(As of the end of the 2022 season)

Bold denotes still active with team.

Italic denotes still active, but not with team.

Games Played

Points

Minutes Played

Rebounds

Assists

Steals

Blocks

Field Goals

3-Pointers Made

Free Throws

Points

Individual Awards
WNBA MVP
Maya Moore – 2014 
Sylvia Fowles – 2017 

WNBA Rookie of the Year
Betty Lennox – 2000 
Seimone Augustus – 2006 
Maya Moore – 2011 
Napheesa Collier – 2019 
Crystal Dangerfield – 2020 

WNBA Defensive Player of the Year
Sylvia Fowles – 2016, 2021 

Sixth Woman of the Year
Candice Wiggins – 2008 

Coach of the Year
Suzie McConnell-Serio – 2004 
Cheryl Reeve – 2011, 2016, 2020 

Dawn Staley Community Leadership Award
Charde Houston – 2011 

All-WNBA First Team
Katie Smith – 2001, 2003 
Lindsay Whalen – 2011, 2013 
Seimone Augustus – 2012 
Maya Moore – 2013, 2014, 2015, 2016, 2017 
Sylvia Fowles – 2017 

All-WNBA Second Team
Betty Lennox – 2000
Katie Smith – 2000, 2002 
Seimone Augustus – 2006, 2007, 2011, 2013, 2014 
Lindsay Whalen – 2012, 2014 
Maya Moore – 2012, 2018 
Sylvia Fowles – 2016, 2021, 2022 
Odyssey Sims – 2019 
Napheesa Collier – 2020 

WNBA All-Defensive First Team
Nicky Anosike – 2009 
Rebekkah Brunson – 2011 
Sylvia Fowles – 2016, 2017, 2021, 2022 

WNBA All-Defensive Second Team
Rebekkah Brunson – 2010, 2013, 2017, 2018 
Maya Moore – 2014, 2017 
Sylvia Fowles — 2018 
Napheesa Collier – 2020 

WNBA All-Rookie Team
Seimone Augustus – 2006 
Lindsey Harding – 2007 
Nicky Anosike – 2008 
Candice Wiggins – 2008 
Renee Montgomery – 2009 
Monica Wright – 2010 
Maya Moore – 2011 
Napheesa Collier - 2019 
Crystal Dangerfield – 2020 

Finals MVP
Seimone Augustus – 2011 
Maya Moore – 2013 
Sylvia Fowles - 2015, 2017

WNBA All-Star
WNBA All-Star Selections
Tonya Edwards – 1999
Betty Lennox – 2000
Katie Smith – 2000, 2001, 2002, 2003, 2004, 2005
Seimone Augustus – 2006, 2007, 2011, 2013, 2014, 2015, 2017, 2018
Nicky Anosike – 2009
Charde Houston – 2009
Rebekkah Brunson – 2010, 2011, 2013, 2017, 2018
Lindsay Whalen - 2010, 2011, 2013, 2014, 2015
Maya Moore – 2011, 2013, 2014, 2015, 2017, 2018
Sylvia Fowles – 2017, 2018, 2019, 2021
Napheesa Collier – 2019, 2021
Odyssey Sims – 2019

WNBA All-Star Game Head Coach
Cheryl Reeve – 2013, 2014, 2017

WNBA All-Star Game MVP
Maya Moore – 2015, 2017, 2018

WNBA Career Awards
WNBA All-Decade Team
Katie Smith

Top 15@15
Katie Smith

WNBA Top 20@20
Katie Smith
Seimone Augustus
Maya Moore
Lindsay Whalen

Top 25
Katie Smith
Seimone Augustus
Maya Moore
Lindsay Whalen
Sylvia Fowles

Franchise Record for Championships

References

Notes

Minnesota Lynx